Ulisses Alves da Silveira, or simply Ulisses (born April 15, 1986 in São Gonçalo), is a Brazilian left back.

Career 
Formerly presented Juventude on loan from Fluminense.

Contract

External links
 sambafoot
 zerozero.pt
 Guardian Stats Centre
 juventude.com

1986 births
Living people
Brazilian footballers
Fluminense FC players
Esporte Clube Juventude players
People from São Gonçalo, Rio de Janeiro
Association football defenders
Sportspeople from Rio de Janeiro (state)